D'Agostini is an Italian surname. Notable people with the surname include:

Franca D'Agostini (born 1952), Italian philosopher
Matt D'Agostini (born 1986), Canadian ice hockey player
Miriam D'Agostini (born 1978), Brazilian tennis player

See also
D'Agostino (surname)

Italian-language surnames